Zachary Ross Robinson (born September 29, 1986) is an American football coach who is the pass game coordinator and quarterbacks coach for the Los Angeles Rams of the National Football League (NFL). He played quarterback at Oklahoma State and was drafted by the New England Patriots in the seventh round of the 2010 NFL Draft, later playing for the Seattle Seahawks, Detroit Lions, and Cincinnati Bengals before retiring in 2013. Robinson became a coach in 2019, serving as an assistant coach for the Rams.

Early years
Robinson attended Chatfield Senior High School in Littleton, Colorado, where he played football at multiple offensive positions. As a senior, Robinson threw for 1,475 yards, 15 touchdowns, and six interceptions. The same season, he also caught 39 passes for 850 yards and 11 touchdowns, while also rushing for 1,078 yards and eight touchdowns.

Playing career

College
Following high school, Robinson attended Oklahoma State University, where he redshirted as a freshman in 2005. He was a reserve quarterback for the Cowboys in 2006, finishing the season with 345 yards on 51 attempts and three touchdowns, while also recording 144 yards rushing.

In the second game of Robinson's 2007 sophomore season, he became the Cowboys' starter at quarterback and went on to lead his team to an appearance in the 2007 Insight Bowl. After taking over the starting role, Robinson recorded 847 yards rushing and 2,824 yards passing and combined for 32 touchdowns. His 3,671 total offensive yards set a school record. In that season, the only other player in Division I FBS to rush for at least 800 yards and pass for 2,800 yards was Heisman Trophy winner Tim Tebow.

Robinson led Oklahoma State to the 2008 Holiday Bowl his junior season. He finished the 2008 regular season with 562 yards rushing with 8 touchdowns and 3,064 yards passing with 25 touchdowns.

Robinson was viewed as one of the best senior quarterbacks in the 2009 preseason. Robinson began the season with a win over Georgia, throwing for 135 yards and two touchdowns. However, his season took a turn when Cowboys running back Kendall Hunter suffered an injury and was sidelined for a good portion of the season while wide receiver Dez Bryant, who became a first round pick in the 2010 NFL Draft, was suspended for the rest of the season, breaking up what Rivals.com had coined the "Best Offensive Trio of 2009." Later in the season, Robinson suffered a concussion and shoulder injury in a game against Texas Tech when he collided with Red Raider cornerback Jamar Wall. He also suffered a hamstring injury at one point during the season, and finished the season with 2,084 yards passing and 15 touchdowns on the season.

Robinson completed his Bachelor of University Studies degree at Oklahoma State in December 2013.

Senior Bowl
Robinson was one of six senior quarterbacks invited to the 2010 Senior Bowl in Mobile, Alabama. Of the six, only Robinson threw for more than 100 yards (176); Robinson was also responsible for the only South team touchdown. In addition, his showing at the 2010 College Football All-Star Challenge was described by ESPN analysts as the "Performance of the Day" out of the twelve participating players.

National Football League

New England Patriots
Robinson was drafted by the New England Patriots in the seventh round (250th overall) of the 2010 NFL Draft. He signed a four-year contract on July 21, 2010. He was released on September 4, 2010.

Seattle Seahawks
On September 5, 2010, the Seattle Seahawks signed Robinson to their practice squad.

On November 6, 2010, Robinson was activated to the Seattle Seahawks 53-man roster to serve as backup to Charlie Whitehurst on November 7, against the New York Giants. He was waived on November 8.

Detroit Lions
On November 9, 2010, Robinson was claimed off waivers by the Detroit Lions. He was waived on September 3, 2011.

Cincinnati Bengals
On September 6, 2011, Robinson was signed to the Bengals practice squad. After the 2011 season, he was signed to the Bengals offseason roster.

Robinson appeared in all four of the Bengals' preseason games in 2012, and although he was waived Robinson was again signed to the practice squad at the end of preseason.

Prior to the 2013 season, he was placed on the PUP list just before training camp due to an elbow injury. His season officially ended on December 10, when the Bengals left him on the PUP list, instead of activating him.

On May 2, 2014, he was waived after failing his physical.

Robinson was invited to the NFL's inaugural veteran's combine in Arizona.

Coaching career

Los Angeles Rams
On February 23, 2019, Robinson began his coaching career and was hired by the Los Angeles Rams as their assistant quarterbacks coach under head coach Sean McVay, following the departure of quarterbacks coach, Zac Taylor, who was hired to become the head coach of the Cincinnati Bengals. In 2020, it was announced that Robinson would switch positions from being the assistant quarterbacks coach to the assistant wide receivers coach. In 2021, he switched back to assistant quarterbacks coach after Liam Coen left for Kentucky. Robinson's team won Super Bowl LVI when the Rams defeated the Cincinnati Bengals.

References

External links
 Los Angeles Rams profile
Oklahoma State Cowboys profile

1986 births
Living people
American football quarterbacks
Cincinnati Bengals players
Detroit Lions players
Los Angeles Rams coaches
New England Patriots players
Oklahoma State Cowboys football players
Players of American football from Colorado
Seattle Seahawks players
Sportspeople from Littleton, Colorado